Montescourt (French: Gare de Montescourt) is a railway station located in the commune of Montescourt-Lizerolles in the Aisne department, France. It is situated at kilometric point (KP) 140.856 on the Creil–Jeumont railway. The station is served by TER Hauts-de-France trains between Compiègne and Saint-Quentin.

History 
In 2018, according to the SNCF 13 215 passengers passed through Montescourt station.

Image gallery

References 

Railway stations in Aisne